Elections to Newtownabbey Borough Council were held on 21 May 1997 on the same day as the other Northern Irish local government elections. The election used four district electoral areas to elect a total of 25 councillors.

Election results

Note: "Votes" are the first preference votes.

Districts summary

|- class="unsortable" align="centre"
!rowspan=2 align="left"|Ward
! % 
!Cllrs
! % 
!Cllrs
! %
!Cllrs
! %
!Cllrs
! % 
!Cllrs
! %
!Cllrs
! %
!Cllrs
!rowspan=2|TotalCllrs
|- class="unsortable" align="center"
!colspan=2 bgcolor="" | UUP
!colspan=2 bgcolor="" | Alliance
!colspan=2 bgcolor="" | DUP
!colspan=2 bgcolor="" | SDLP
!colspan=2 bgcolor="" | UDP
!colspan=2 bgcolor="" | PUP
!colspan=2 bgcolor="white"| Others
|-
|align="left"|Antrim Line
|bgcolor="#40BFF5"|38.1
|bgcolor="#40BFF5"|3
|12.1
|1
|9.4
|1
|21.8
|1
|5.6
|0
|0.0
|0
|13.0
|1
|7
|-
|align="left"|Ballyclare
|bgcolor="#40BFF5"|42.6
|bgcolor="#40BFF5"|3
|14.9
|1
|17.8
|1
|0.0
|0
|3.5
|0
|5.7
|0
|15.5
|0
|5
|-
|align="left"|Macedon
|15.8
|1
|2.3
|0
|9.1
|0
|0.0
|0
|8.5
|1
|7.2
|0
|bgcolor="#DDDDDD"|57.1
|bgcolor="#DDDDDD"|4
|6
|-
|align="left"|University
|bgcolor="#40BFF5"|26.7
|bgcolor="#40BFF5"|3
|12.5
|1
|9.5
|0
|0.0
|0
|5.6
|0
|8.7
|1
|37.0
|2
|7
|-
|- class="unsortable" class="sortbottom" style="background:#C9C9C9"
|align="left"| Total
|31.4
|10
|10.3
|3
|10.7
|2
|6.5
|1
|5.8
|1
|5.1
|1
|30.2
|7
|25
|-
|}

Districts results

Antrim Line

1993: 2 x UUP, 2 x Alliance, 1 x DUP, 1 x SDLP, 1 x Independent Unionist
1997: 3 x UUP, 1 x SDLP, 1 x Alliance, 1 x DUP, 1 x Newtownabbey Ratepayers
1993-1997 Change: UUP and Newtownabbey Ratepayers gain from Alliance and Independent Unionist

Ballyclare

1993: 3 x UUP, 1 x DUP, 1 x Independent Unionist
1997: 3 x UUP, 1 x DUP, 1 x Alliance
1993-1997 Change: Alliance gain from Independent Unionist

Macedon

1993: 2 x UUP, 1 x DUP, 1 x Alliance, 1 x Newtownabbey Labour, 1 x Independent Unionist
1997: 2 x Newtownabbey Labour, 1 x UUP, 1 x UDP, 1 x Newtownabbey Ratepayers, 1 x Independent Unionist
1993-1997 Change: Newtownabbey Labour, Newtownabbey Ratepayers and UDP gain from UUP, DUP and Alliance

University

1993: 3 x UUP, 2 x DUP, 1 x Alliance, 1 x Independent Unionist
1997: 3 x UUP, 2 x Independent Unionist, 1 x Alliance, 1 x PUP
1993-1997 Change: PUP and Independent Unionist gain from DUP (two seats)

References

Newtownabbey Borough Council elections
Newtownabbey